"Knee Deep in the Blues" is a song written by Melvin Endsley, and recorded by American country music artist Marty Robbins. It was released on December 17, 1956 as the lead single from his compilation album Marty's Greatest Hits. The song reached #3 on the Country Singles charts.

Guy Mitchell version

Guy Mitchell released a cover version of the song the same year that reached No. 16 on the Billboard Hot 100. In the UK, it reached No. 3 on the UK Singles Chart.

Cover versions
 The Derailers on their 1999 album, Full Western Dress.
 The International Submarine Band on their 1968 album, Safe at Home.
 Del McCoury on his 1988 album, Don't Stop the Music.
 Carl Smith on his 1968 album, Country on My Mind.
 Tommy Steele in 1957, which went to No. 15 on the UK charts.

References

1957 songs
1957 singles
Marty Robbins songs
Guy Mitchell songs
Tommy Steele songs
Carl Smith (musician) songs
Songs written by Melvin Endsley
Columbia Records singles